Deva Raya I (reigned 1406–1422 CE) was a king of the Vijayanagara Empire (of the Sangama Dynasty). After Harihara II died there was a dispute between his sons over the throne in which Deva Raya I eventually emerged victor. He was a very capable ruler noted for his military exploits and his support to irrigation works in his kingdom. He modernized the Vijayanagara army by improving the cavalry, employed skilled archers of the Turkish clan and raised the fighting capacity of his bowmen and horses from Arabia and Persia. Of Deva Raya I, the Italian traveler Nicolo Conti, who visited Vijayanagara in c.1420, described thus: "In this city, there are 90,000 men fit to bear arms... their king is more powerful than all the kings of India". Conti also noted that the royal city had grown to a circumference of 60 mi. Deva Raya I was a patron of Kannada literature and architecture. Madhura, a noted Jain poet was in his court (and also in the court of his father  King Harihara II) and wrote in Kannada the Dharmanathapurana on the life of the fifteenth Jain Tirthankar (Dharmanatha), and a poem in eulogy of Gommateshvara of Shravanabelagola. The noted Hazare Rama temple, an excellent example of Deccan architecture was constructed during his rule. One of Deva Raya's queens Bhima Devi was a disciple of the Jain guru Abhinava Charukirti Panditacharya. She was a devotee of Shantinatha, 16th Jain tirthankara and built a temple at the Mangayi Basti in Shravanabelagola.

Irrigation works and general administration

The credit for making the capital city of the Vijayanagara Empire one of the biggest cities in the 15th century goes to Deva Raya I. He realized that the scarcity of water supply, both for drinking and for irrigation, was restricting the growth of the royal capital. In c.1410 he had a barrage constructed across the Tungabhadra river and commissioned a 24 km long aqueduct from the Tungabhadra river to the capital. The account provided by Nuniz gives a details of the projects undertaken by Deva Raya I that brought prosperity to the Kingdom. He maintained a secular attitude in administrative matters. He had a Mosque and a slaughter house constructed for the convenience of the Muslim soldiers in his army. In c. 1413, a dispute over property between the Shanka Jainalya of Lakshmeshwara and the Someshvara temple trust of the palace was settled in favor of the Jains. Deva Raya I had a Muslim bodyguard who built a choultry in honor of the king.

Military campaigns
Throughout his reign, Deva Raya was continually at war with the Velamas of Telangana, the Bahmani Sultan of Gulbarga, the Reddis of Kondavidu, and the traditional rivals of Vijayanagara, the Gajaptis of Kalinga. Deva Raya I was capable of managing the vast territory that he controlled by employing skilled archers of the Turkish clan and raised the fighting capacity of his bowmen. Following a confusion in the Reddi kingdom, Deva Raya I entered into an alliance with Warangal for partitioning the Reddi kingdom between them. The split of Warangal changed the balance of power in the Deccan. In c.1420, Firoz Shah invaded Pangal but the two-year siege at Pangal ended in disease and disaster for Firoz Shah's armies. Deva Raya inflicted a shattering defeat on Firoz Shah. Deva Raya's army massacred Firoz Shah's troops and created a great platform with their heads upon the field of battle. Firoz was followed deep into his own territory, which was completely devastated by the rampaging Hindu army under Deva Raya I. The Hindu army destroyed many mosques and holy places belonging to the Islamic community, and committed great carnages on the civilian Mussalman population. The Sultan had to hand over the southern and eastern districts of his kingdom to Deva Raya I to secure peace. Consequently, by c.1422, Deva Raya I came to control territory up to the Krishna river - Tungabhadra river doab including Pangal In the following days, the distressed Sultan died after leading a life of piety after abdicating power to his brother Ahmad. Unable to accept this turn around, the Gajapati King Bhanudeva of Odisha invaded Rajamahendri. When a war with Vijayanagara seemed imminent, some skilful diplomacy by Vijayanagara chief Dodda Alla averted it. Deva Raya was to be succeeded by his sons Ramachandra Raya and shortly thereafter by Vijaya Raya.

Ferishta's account
Persian writer Ferishta narrates an interesting story, not repeated or supported  by any other contemporary source, of the kings' love for a beautiful girl, a daughter of a goldsmith from Mudugal in the Raichur district. Unable to wed her, a frustrated Deva Raya I attacked Mudgal and laid to waste a few villages. Aroused by this provocation, the Bahamani Sultan Taj ud-Din Firuz Shah invaded Vijayanagara leading to defeat of Deva Raya I. Though injured in the conflict, Firuz Shah sent his able commanders who successfully invaded Vijayanagara territory south of Adoni.

According to this account, Deva Raya I had to give as tribute, one of his daughters in marriage to the Sultan's prince, several pearls and cash, Bankapura territory, fifty elephants, and 2000 dancers. The goldsmith's daughter who was the reason for the war was wedded to Hassan Khan, a prince in the Sultan's family.

Gallery

Notes

References

External links
Our Karnataka article
AP Online article

1422 deaths
15th-century Indian monarchs
People of the Vijayanagara Empire
Indian Hindus
Hindu monarchs
Sangama dynasty
Year of birth unknown